Gattan or Gatan may refer to:
 Gattan-e Olya
 Gattan-e Sofla